Crooked River may refer to:

Watercourses
In Australia
 Crooked River (New South Wales)
 Crooked River (Victoria)

In Canada
 Crooked River (British Columbia)
 Crooked River Provincial Park

In Ireland
 Crooked River (Ireland)

In New Zealand
 Crooked River (New Zealand)

In the United States
 Crooked River (Florida)
 Crooked River (Georgia)
 Crooked River (Idaho)
 Crooked River (Maine)
 Crooked River (Machias River)
 Crooked River (Songo River)
 Crooked River (Maryland)
 Crooked River (Massachusetts)
 Crooked River (Michigan)
 Crooked River (Missouri)
 Crooked River (Oregon)
 Crooked River National Grassland
 Crooked River Ranch, Oregon
 Crooked River Gorge
 The Cuyahoga River in Ohio is sometimes called the Crooked River

Other
Crooked River (film), a 1950 Western film starring James Ellison
Crooked River, Saskatchewan, a special service area in the Canadian province of Saskatchewan

See also

Crooked Creek (disambiguation)